Río Cuarto is a district of the Río Cuarto canton, in the Alajuela province of Costa Rica.

History 
Río Cuarto was created on 11 October 2018 by Acuerdo Ejecutivo N°044-2018-MGP.

Geography 
Río Cuarto has an area of  km² and an elevation of  metres.

Demographics 

For the 2011 census, Río Cuarto had not been created, but in the records there was a population of  inhabitants. However, its inhabitants were part of Río Cuarto canton when it was a district of Grecia canton, and therefore this figure includes the population of the Santa Rita and Santa Isabel districts created in 2018.

Transportation

Road transportation 
The district is covered by the following road routes:
 National Route 140
 National Route 708
 National Route 744

References 

Districts of Alajuela Province
Populated places in Alajuela Province